Kristen Gillman (born September 22, 1997) is an American professional golfer currently playing on the LPGA Tour. As an amateur, she won the U.S. Women's Amateur twice, in 2014 and 2018.

Early life, college and amateur career
Gillman is one of the most-decorated junior golfers in recent U.S. history. She won the U.S. Women's Amateur in 2014 and 2018, the Junior PGA Championship in 2014 and the North and South Women's Amateur in 2016. She made a series of successful appearances for the U.S. national Team and won the 2014 Junior Ryder Cup, the 2015 Junior Solheim Cup, the 2016 Toyota Junior Golf World Cup in Japan, the 2018 Curtis Cup and the 2018 Arnold Palmer Cup at Evian Resort Golf Club in France. She also won the 2018 Espirito Santo Trophy in Ireland with Jennifer Kupcho and Lilia Vu. She won the silver medal with the Mixed team at the 2015 Pan American Games.

Gillman enrolled at the University of Alabama in 2016. She was SEC Freshman of the Year playing for Alabama Crimson Tide golf and set several school records.

As an amateur, she made six starts on the LPGA Tour, including the 2018 U.S. Women's Open, where she made her first cut and finished T27. She won the Century 21 Ladies Golf Tournament on the 2018 LPGA of Japan Tour.

Professional career
Gillman turned professional in late 2018 after she finished T13 at the inaugural LPGA Q-Series to earn membership for the 2019 LPGA Tour. She made 22 cuts in 26 starts her rookie season, with a career-best T3 finish at the Buick LPGA Shanghai. She finished 43rd on the money list and second in the Rookie of the Year standings, behind Lee Jeong-eun who won the 2019 U.S. Women's Open. Gillman made the cut in three majors, including a T6 finish at the 2019 ANA Inspiration.

Gillman finished tied 11th at the 2020 Women's British Open, after which she rose to 38th in the Women's World Golf Rankings.

Amateur wins
2013 Genesis Shootout
2014 Junior PGA Championship, U.S. Women's Amateur
2016 Bishops Gate Golf Academy Junior, Toyota Junior Golf World Cup (individual champion), Under Armour - Jordan Spieth Championship, North and South Women's Amateur
2017 Bryan National Collegiate, The Schooner Fall Classic
2018 U.S. Women's Amateur

Source:

Professional wins (1)

LPGA of Japan Tour wins (1)

Results in LPGA majors
Results not in chronological order.

CUT = missed the half-way cut
NT = no tournament
T = tied

U.S. national team appearances
Amateur
Junior Ryder Cup: 2014 (winners)
Junior Solheim Cup: 2015 (winners)
Pan American Games: 2015
Toyota Junior Golf World Cup: 2016 (winners)
Curtis Cup: 2018 (winners)
Arnold Palmer Cup: 2018 (winners)
Espirito Santo Trophy: 2018 (winners)

References

External links

American female golfers
LPGA Tour golfers
Winners of ladies' major amateur golf championships
Alabama Crimson Tide women's golfers
Pan American Games silver medalists for the United States
Pan American Games medalists in golf
Golfers at the 2015 Pan American Games
Medalists at the 2015 Pan American Games
Golfers from Austin, Texas
1997 births
Living people